2013 Malta Open is a darts tournament, which took place at the Topaz Hotel in Buġibba, Malta in 2013.

Results

References

2013 in darts
2013 in Maltese sport
Darts in Malta
St. Paul's Bay